Naked Tango is a 1990 erotic drama film. An Argentinean-international co-production, it was written and directed by Leonard Schrader, and stars Vincent D'Onofrio, Mathilda May, Esai Morales and Fernando Rey. The choreography was created by Carlos Rivarola.

Synopsis
Returning by ship to Buenos Aires in the 1920s, a young woman escapes her elderly husband by swapping places with a woman committing suicide. She believes her new life will be that of an arranged marriage but finds it is in fact a ruse to cause her to work in a brothel. The film plays on the association of tango with brothels and clearly alludes to the practices of the Zwi Migdal white-slavery and prostitution ring that was active in Buenos Aires early in the twentieth century and was dissolved thanks to Raquel Liberman.

Cast
Vincent D'Onofrio …Cholo
Mathilda May …Alba / Stephanie (Estefanía)
Fernando Rey …Juez Torres
Tony Payne …Waiter
Henry Holmes …Passenger
Anthony Pratt …Boat Captain
Roberto Scheuer …Inmmigration Officer
Esai Morales …Zico Borenstein
Cipe Lincovsky …Mother
Josh Mostel …Jewellery man Bertoni
Sergio Lerer …Fake Rabbi
Patricio Bisso …Gastón The Hairdresser
Constance McCashin …Flora
Vando Villamil …Cop
Javier Portales …Chief Inspector of Police
Marcos Woinski
Rubén Szuchmacher
Néstor Zacco …Cop
Inés Yujnovsky …Bebe
Harry Havilio …Doctor
Kerry Warn
Anne Henry …Maid
Bill James …Butler
Armando Capó …Guard
Claudio Garófalo …Musician
Héctor Arbelo
Santos Maggi
Jorge Sabaté
Guillermina Quiroga …Woman at the Cabaret
Grecia Levy

Awards
The film was nominated for the Critics' Prize at the 1991 Deauville Film Festival.

References

External links

Naked Tango at Cinenacional.com

1990 films
1990s erotic drama films
English-language Argentine films
Argentine erotic drama films
Films set in the 1920s
Films shot in Buenos Aires
Films set in Buenos Aires
Films scored by Thomas Newman
American erotic drama films
New Line Cinema films
1990 drama films
1990s English-language films
1990s American films
Films about prostitution in Argentina
1990s Argentine films